The Amos Block is a Romanesque Revival building located on the southwest corner of Clinton Square in Downtown Syracuse, New York.  The building's developer and namesake, Jacob Amos, served as mayor of Syracuse from 1892 to 1896.  Originally, the  Erie Canal ran directly behind the Amos Block, and goods were loaded and unloaded from the building's upper levels onto the Canal, while the first floor on the West Water St side contained a retail grocer.  The building was added to the National Register of Historic Places in 1978.

In 2006, the Amos Block was renovated, and was renamed "The Amos."  The building continues to serve as a multi-purpose structure, with retail (including, once again, a grocery store) on the first floor, and residential apartments on the upper floors.

See also
National Register of Historic Places listings in Syracuse, New York

References

Commercial buildings on the National Register of Historic Places in New York (state)
Buildings and structures in Syracuse, New York
National Register of Historic Places in Syracuse, New York